The Northern Xinjiang railway or Beijiang railway is a railway in Xinjiang, China, between Ürümqi, the regional capital of Xinjiang, and Alashankou on the border with Kazakhstan. The line extends the Lanzhou–Xinjiang railway west from Ürümqi to the Turkestan–Siberia railway on the Kazakh border and forms a section of the Trans-Eurasian Railway from Rotterdam to Lianyungang. The line was opened in 1992. It was partially funded by the government loan of the Soviet Union.

A new double-track line between Ürümqi and Jinghe was built in 2009 to supplement the Northern Xinjiang railway.

The Northern Xinjiang,  Kuytun–Beitun, Altay–Fuyun–Zhundong, and Ürümqi–Dzungaria railways form a loop.

Branches
The Kuytun–Beitun branch and the Jinghe–Yining–Khorgas branch were opened in 2009.

List of stations
Second Ürümqi–Jinghe railway runs parallel to Northern Xinjiang railway (from Ürümqi to Jinghe)

Gallery

See also

 Dzungarian Alatau
 List of railways in China

References

Railway lines in China
Rail transport in Xinjiang
Railway lines opened in 1992